Pavlovsky District  is an administrative and municipal district (raion), one of the thirty-two in Voronezh Oblast, Russia. It is located in the center of the oblast. Its administrative center is the town of Pavlovsk. Population:  The population of Pavlovsk accounts for 43.8% of the district's total population.

References

Notes

Sources

Districts of Voronezh Oblast